Rafael Peles (born 1936) is an Israeli former sports shooter. He competed in the 50 metre rifle, three positions and 50 metre rifle, prone events at the 1960 Summer Olympics.

References

1936 births
Living people
Israeli male sport shooters
Olympic shooters of Israel
Shooters at the 1960 Summer Olympics
Place of birth missing (living people)